Skin Companion EP 2 is an extended play (EP) by Australian electronic musician Flume. The four-track EP was written during the production of Flume's studio album, Skin, and was released digitally on 17 February 2017, by Future Classic as a companion to the album. The EP was released on vinyl on 5 May 2017.

Upon release, Flume said: "I'm really happy with how the Companion EP 2 has come out. There's so many tracks I've been wanting to get off my chest for so long now and I think it's kinda the end of the Skin kinda campaign and it's a nice way to end it because it's instrumental stuff, there's some vocal collabs... I'm just really proud of how it's turned out."

The EP features vocals from American rapper Pusha T, Moses Sumney, and Glass Animals frontman Dave Bayley.

Critical reception

Skin Companion EP 2 received mixed to positive reviews by critics.

Track listing
Note: All tracks were produced by Flume.

Vinyl
Side A
 "Hyperreal" (featuring Kučka)
 "Enough"
 "Depth Charge"
Side B
 "Weekend"
 "Fantastic

Charts

Release history

References

2017 EPs
Flume (musician) EPs
Albums produced by Flume (musician)
Mom + Pop Music albums